Wellington—Grey, renamed Wellington—Grey—Dufferin—Waterloo in 1970, was a federal electoral district represented in the House of Commons of Canada from 1968 to 1979. It was located in the province of Ontario. This riding was created in 1966 from parts of Dufferin—Simcoe, Grey—Bruce, Waterloo North, Wellington South and Wellington—Huron ridings.

Wellington—Grey consisted of:
 the Townships of Amarath, East Luther, Melancthon and East Garafraxa excepting the Town of Orangeville in the County of Dufferin,
 the Town of Durham and the Townships of Artemesia, Egremont, Glenelg, Normanby and Proton in the County of Grey, 
 the Townships of Wellesley and Woolwich in the County of Waterloo, 
 the Townships of Arthur, West Garafraxa, West Luther, Maryborough, Minto, Nichol, Peel and Pilkington in the County of Wellington, and
 the Town of Palmerston.

The electoral district was abolished in 1976 when it was redistributed between Bruce—Grey, Dufferin—Wellington, Grey—Simcoe, Guelph and Waterloo ridings.

Members of Parliament

Electoral history

|- 
  
|Progressive Conservative
|Marvin Howe 
|align="right"|12,118 
  
|Liberal
|Jon Church 
|align="right"|12,027 
 
|New Democratic
|Edward E. Seymour 
|align="right"|2,902 
 
|Independent
|Melvin Francis Kienapple
|align="right"| 224   
|}

|- 
  
|Progressive Conservative
|Perrin Beatty
|align="right"| 17,080 
  
|Liberal
|Allan F. Ross
|align="right"| 11,640 
 
|New Democratic
|Don Francis
|align="right"| 4,846   
|}

|- 
  
|Progressive Conservative
|Perrin Beatty
|align="right"| 17,253 
  
|Liberal
|Brian Kirkham
|align="right"| 12,500 
 
|New Democratic
|Don Francis 
|align="right"| 4,297 
|}

See also 

 List of Canadian federal electoral districts
 Past Canadian electoral districts

External links 

 Website of the Parliament of Canada

Former federal electoral districts of Ontario